Bela is a small settlement at the source of White Creek, which is a tributary of the Vipava River in the Municipality of Ajdovščina in the Littoral region of Slovenia.

References

External links 
Bela at Geopedia

Populated places in the Municipality of Ajdovščina